The 2012 FIFA Club World Cup (officially known as the FIFA Club World Cup Japan 2012 presented by Toyota for sponsorship reasons) was a football tournament that was played from 6 to 16 December 2012. It was the ninth edition of the FIFA Club World Cup, a FIFA-organised tournament between the winners of the six continental confederations as well as the host nation's league champions. The tournament was hosted by Japan.

Defending champions Barcelona did not qualify as they were eliminated in the semi-finals of the 2011–12 UEFA Champions League by eventual champions Chelsea.

Corinthians won the title for the second time, winning 1–0 in the semi-finals against Al Ahly before beating Chelsea by the same margin in the final.

Host bids
The FIFA Executive Committee appointed Japan as hosts for the 2011 and 2012 tournaments on 27 May 2008 during their meeting in Sydney, Australia.

Qualified teams

Match officials
The appointed referees are:

Squads

Each team submitted a squad of 23 players, three of them goalkeepers. The squads were announced on 29 November 2012.

Venues
The venues for the 2012 FIFA Club World Cup were Yokohama and Toyota.

Goal-line technology
The 2012 FIFA Club World Cup was the first FIFA tournament to use goal-line technology following its approval by the International Football Association Board (IFAB) in July 2012. The two systems approved by FIFA, GoalRef (installed in Yokohama) and Hawk-Eye (installed in Toyota), were used in the two stadiums.

Matches
The draw for the 2012 FIFA Club World Cup was held at the FIFA headquarters in Zürich, Switzerland, on 24 September 2012 at 11:30 CEST (UTC+02:00). The draw decided the "positions" in the bracket for the three representatives which entered the quarter-finals (AFC/CAF/CONCACAF).

If a match was tied after normal playing time:
For elimination matches, extra time was played. If still tied after extra time, a penalty shoot-out was held to determine the winner.
For the matches for fifth place and third place, no extra time was played, and a penalty shoot-out was held to determine the winner.

All times Japan Standard Time (UTC+09:00).

Play-off for quarter-finals

A minute's silence was held before the match to commemorate Dutch linesman Richard Nieuwenhuizen, who had died following a violent incident at a youth competition four days before the match.

Quarter-finals

Match for fifth place

Semi-finals

Match for third place

Final

Goalscorers

1 own goal
 Dárvin Chávez (Monterrey, against Chelsea)
 Hiroki Mizumoto (Sanfrecce Hiroshima, against Ulsan Hyundai)

Awards

The following awards were given for the tournament.

References

External links

FIFA Club World Cup Japan 2012, FIFA.com
2012 FIFA Club World Cup Official Site (Archived)
FIFA Technical Report

 
2012
2012
2012 in association football
2012 in Brazilian football
2012 in Japanese football
2012 in South Korean football
2012–13 in English football
2012–13 in Egyptian football
2012–13 in Mexican football
2012–13 in New Zealand association football
December 2012 sports events in Japan